As of December 2022, Indian airline SpiceJet flies to a total of 61 destinations, including 52 domestic destinations and 7 international destinations within Asia.

List

See also
 Air India Express destinations
 Alliance Air destinations
 List of Vistara destinations
 List of Go First destinations
 List of IndiGo destinations

References

Lists of airline destinations